Shacklewell Hollow is a  biological Site of Special Scientific Interest east of Empingham in Rutland, and beside the A606 road.

This marshy site is in the valley of a tributary of the River Gwash. The marsh is dominated by hard rush, and there are several artificial ponds with large populations of mare's tail. There are also areas of calcareous grassland and alder wood.

The site is private property with no public access.

Shacklewell Hollow is also the name of a Scout campsite.

References

Sites of Special Scientific Interest in Rutland